Bernd Laube (13 November 1950 – 5 December 2012) was a German football striker.

References

1950 births
2012 deaths
German footballers
Hertha BSC players
Wormatia Worms players
VfR Heilbronn players
SSV Jahn Regensburg players
SC Herford players
Association football forwards
Bundesliga players
2. Bundesliga players
Hannover 96 managers
People from Bottrop
Sportspeople from Münster (region)
Footballers from North Rhine-Westphalia